The 204 Air Group was a unit of the Imperial Japanese Navy (IJN) during the Pacific campaign of World War II.  The unit was formed on 1 November 1942 by re-designating 6th Air Group and served in New Guinea and Rabaul. The air group was disbanded on 4 March 1944.

References
 Bullard, Steven (translator). Japanese Army Operations in the South Pacific Area, New Britain and Papua campaigns, 1942–43  Senshi Sōshō (translated excerpts). Canberra: Australian War Memorial, 2007. .

204
Military units and formations established in 1942
1942 establishments in Japan
Military units and formations disestablished in 1944
1944 disestablishments in Japan